Jincy Phillip (born 12 April 1977) is an Indian sprinter. She competed in the women's 4 × 400 metres relay at the 2000 Summer Olympics. She also won a gold and silver medal, at the 2002 and the 1998 Asian Games respectively.

References

External links
 

1977 births
Living people
Athletes (track and field) at the 2000 Summer Olympics
Indian female sprinters
Olympic athletes of India
Place of birth missing (living people)
Asian Games medalists in athletics (track and field)
Asian Games gold medalists for India
Asian Games silver medalists for India
Athletes (track and field) at the 1998 Asian Games
Athletes (track and field) at the 2002 Asian Games
Medalists at the 1998 Asian Games
Medalists at the 2002 Asian Games
Olympic female sprinters